Sula Lighthouse is a coastal lighthouse in the municipality of Frøya in Trøndelag county, Norway.  The lighthouse is located on the island of Sula.  The lighthouse was originally built here in 1793 and another in 1804.  The current tower was built in 1909.  It is part of a series of lighthouses along the Froan islands in Frøya including the Finnvær Lighthouse, Vingleia Lighthouse, and Halten Lighthouse.  It is lit from July 21 until May 16 each year.  It is not lit during the summer due to the midnight sun of the region.

History
The first light at Sula was built in 1793. The present lighthouse was completed in 1909 and it was automated in 1974. The white light flashes three times every 30 seconds. A 2nd order Fresnel lens is used for the light.

See also

 List of lighthouses in Norway
 Lighthouses in Norway

References

External links
 Norsk Fyrhistorisk Forening 
 

Lighthouses completed in 1793
Lighthouses completed in 1804
Lighthouses completed in 1904
Froan
Lighthouses in Trøndelag
1793 establishments in Norway